S22 may refer to:

Aviation 
 Hermiston Municipal Airport, in Umatilla County, Oregon, United States
 Letov Š-22, a prototype Czechoslovak fighter
 SIAI S.22, an Italian racing flying boat
 Sikorsky S-22, a Russian trainer

Rail and transit 
 S22 (RER Vaud), an S-Bahn line in Switzerland
 S22 (ZVV), a former Zürich S-Bahn line
 Kozawa Station, in Kyōwa, Hokkaidō, Japan
 Shōji Station (Osaka, Osaka), in Japan

Roads 
 Expressway S22 (Poland)
 County Route S22 (California), United States

Submarines 
 
 
 , of the Royal Navy
 , of the Indian Navy
 , of the Indian Navy
 , of the United States Navy

Other uses 
 British NVC community S22, a swamps and tall-herb fens community in the British National Vegetation Classification system
 Karry S22, a Chinese MPV
 S22: Do not breathe dust, a safety phrase
 Samsung Galaxy S22, a series of smartphones
 Sisu S-22, a Finnish lorry